The Sino-Latin American Production Capacity Cooperation Investment Fund (also referred to as the China-LAC Industrial Cooperation Investment Fund and abbreviated as Claifund) is a multilateral cooperation fund established by the Chinese government to support investments by Chinese companies in Latin America. 

It is one of two multilateral cooperation funds created by the Chinese government to advance the economic relationship between China and Latin America. The other is the China-LAC Cooperation Fund. Similar to the investment funds in promoting economic ties, the Special Loan Program for China-Latin America Infrastructure Project is a special credit line created by the Chinese government.

Fundraising
The first phase of capital for the fund was in the amount of US$10 billion. The capital contribution came from three Chinese government entities: the People's Bank of China, the State Administration of Foreign Exchange, and the China Development Bank. Part of the initial capital came from the foreign exchange reserves of China.

Investments
The target investments of the fund are described as "medium- and long-term projects in the fields of manufacturing, new and high technology, agriculture, energy, infrastructure" including hydroelectric power plants.

References

Belt and Road Initiative
Private equity firms of China